Murray Myers (born February 9, 1952) is a Canadian former professional ice hockey forward.  He played 148 games in the World Hockey Association with the Philadelphia Blazers, Vancouver Blazers and Cincinnati Stingers.

External links

1952 births
Canadian ice hockey forwards
Cincinnati Stingers players
Hampton Gulls (SHL) players
Kimberley Dynamiters players
Living people
Philadelphia Blazers players
Roanoke Valley Rebels (SHL) players
St. Louis Blues draft picks
Saskatoon Blades players
Swift Current Broncos players
Vancouver Blazers players